Trond Høiby (born 24 January 1973 in Askim, Østfold) is a retired decathlete from Norway. He set his personal best score (8085 points) on 4 July 1999 at a meet in Herentals. He is a four-time national champion in the men's decathlon (1994-1995-1996-1997).

Achievements

References

sports-reference

1973 births
Living people
Norwegian decathletes
Athletes (track and field) at the 2000 Summer Olympics
Olympic athletes of Norway
People from Askim
Sportspeople from Viken (county)